The 2017 Dahsyatnya Awards, honoring the best in music and entertainment (or popular culture) for 2017, was held on January 25, 2017, at the Ecopark Ocean Ecovention Ancol in Pademangan, North Jakarta. It was broadcast live on RCTI. It's the ninth annual show and was hosted by Raffi Ahmad, Ayu Dewi, Denny Cagur, Syahnaz Sadiqah, Anwar Sanjaya and Felycia Angelistya. The ceremonies awards were held the theme for "We Are Dahsyat" and presenting 14 categories award, including special award and a new category to Outstanding EDM.

Tulus led the nominations with six categories, followed Isyana Sarasvati and Raisa Andriana, both of earned four nominations. Afgan has become biggest winner for taking home two awards, including Outstanding Song for "Kunci Hati".

Performances

Presenters
 Ayu Dewi, Syahnaz Sadqah, Raffi Ahmad and Felycia Angelistya – Presented Outstanding Duo/Group
 Raffi Ahmad, Anwar Sanjaya and Dunia Terbalik cast – Presented Outstanding Dangdut Singer
 Raffi Ahmad, Denny Cagur, Syahnaz Sadiqah, Anwar Sanjaya and Felycia Angelistya – Presented Outstanding Male Solo Singer
 Raffi Ahmad, Denny Cagur, Syahnaz Sadiqah, Anwar Sanjaya and Felycia Angelistya – Presented Outstanding Female Solo Singer
 Raffi Ahmad, Denny Cagur and Ayu Dewi – Presented Lifetime Achievement Award
 Raffi Ahmad, Syahnaz Sadiqah, Felycia Angelistya, Anwar Sanjaya, Denny Cagur and Dunia Terbalik – Presented Outstanding Video Clip
 Syahnaz Sadiqah, Felycia Angelistya and Anwar Sanjaya – Presented Outstanding Guest Star
 Raffi Ahmad and Denny Cagur – Presented Outstanding EDM
 Raffi Ahmad and Denny Cagur – Presented Outstanding Band
 Raffi Ahmad, Ayu Dewi, Denny Cagur, Syahnaz Sadiqah, Anwar Sanjaya and Felycia Angelistya – Presented Outstanding Song

Winners and nominees
The nominees were announced on January 2, 2017. Winners are listed first and highlighted.

Website vote and SMS

Jury

References

2017 music awards
Dahsyatnya Awards
Indonesian music awards